Xanlıqoba (also, Khanlykhoba and Khanlykoba) is a village and municipality in the Khachmaz Rayon of Azerbaijan.  It has a population of 429.

References 

Populated places in Khachmaz District